Herbert Charles Ludbrook (8 November 1888 – 15 January 1956) was an Australian politician.

He was born in Ballarat East to builder George Henry Ludbrook and Mary Ann Lowe. He was a painter, and in 1906 joined the 9th Light Horse. During World War I he served with the 6th Field Ambulance in Gallipoli and in France, where he was badly wounded. In 1918 he married Daisie Mary Llewellyn in London, England; they had two daughters. In 1925 he became superintendent of Ballarat Orphanage. He was elected to the Victorian Legislative Council as a Liberal and Country Party member for Ballarat Province in 1949. Ludbrook died in Ballarat in 1956.

References

1888 births
1956 deaths
Liberal Party of Australia members of the Parliament of Victoria
Members of the Victorian Legislative Council
20th-century Australian politicians